Nguyễn Du (3 January 1766 – 16 September 1820), pen names Tố Như and Thanh Hiên, is a celebrated Vietnamese poet. He is most known for writing the epic poem The Tale of Kiều.

Biography

Youth

Nguyễn Du was born in a great wealthy family in 1765 in Bích Câu, Thăng Long. His father's name is Nguyễn Nghiễm, who was born in Tiên Điền village, Nghi Xuân, Hà Tĩnh, Vietnam. He was the seventh child of Nguyễn Nghiễm, a former prime minister under the Lê dynasty. By the age of 10, Du lost his father, he also lost his mother at age 13, so for most of his teen years he lived with his brother Nguyễn Khản or with his brother-in-law Đoàn Nguyễn Tuấn.

At the age of 19 (some sources say 17), Du passed the provincial examination and received the title of "tú tài" (Bachelor's degree), which made him (very roughly) the equivalent of a high school graduate. However, in Nguyễn Du's time this was a far more difficult credential to obtain both because few people were affluent enough to devote themselves to study and because of exacting standards applied.

Du's mother was his father's third wife, noted for her ability at singing and composing poetry. In fact, she made her living by singing, which at that time was considered a disreputable occupation. It is said that Du may have inherited a part of his talents from his mother. He loved listening to traditional songs; and there was a rumor that, when he was 18, he himself eloped with a songstress.

Adulthood

After passing the provincial exam, he was appointed to the position of a military advisor in the Royal (Trịnh) army. After the Trịnh lords were defeated in 1786 by Nguyễn Huệ (the second youngest, most able and popular of the three Tây Sơn brothers), Nguyễn Du refused to serve in the Tây Sơn administration. He was arrested and held for some time before moving back to his native village in the north of the country.

When Nguyễn Ánh defeated the Tây Sơn and took control over all of Vietnam in 1802, Nguyễn Du agreed to serve in his administration (many mandarins from the north refused to do this as it was widely felt that a mandarin should only serve one dynasty). At first he was given his old post of military advisor but after a decade he was promoted to ambassador to China (1813). While in China, he discovered and translated the Ming dynasty era tale that would become the basis for the Tale of Kieu. He was later appointed to two more diplomatic missions to Peking, but before he could depart for the last one, he died of a long illness for which he refused treatment.

Du's father had been a minister under the Lê dynasty, and his family had benefited greatly under their rule. For most of his life, Nguyễn Du was haunted by what he felt was his own betrayal of the rightful rulers of Vietnam, which occurred when he accepted a post under the Nguyễn dynasty.

The Tale of Kiều

The Tale of Kiều (Vietnamese Truyện Kiều) was based on an earlier Chinese prose narrative, Kim Vân Kiều. It was written under a pen-name as the story was quite critical of the basic tenets of Confucian morality. It is a tragic tale of two lovers forced apart by the girl's loyalty to her family honor. In Vietnam, the poem is so popular and beloved that some people know the whole epic by heart and can recite it without a mistake.

Other works
Thanh Hiên thi tập ( Poems of Thanh Hiên)
Nam Trung Tạp Ngâm ( Various Poems Made in the South)
Bắc Hành Tạp Lục ( Various Records during the Travel to the North)
Văn tế thập loại chúng sinh ( Literature of the Ten Kinds of Beings)
Long thành cầm giả ca ( The Musician at the Dragon Citadel)

Modern depiction
 Portrayed by Quách Ngọc Ngoan in the 2010 movie The Musician at the Dragon Citadel.

Sources
Renowned Vietnamese Intellectuals prior to the 20th Century (essay by the Vietnamese historian Nguyễn Khắc Viện) published by Thế Giới Publishers, 2004.

See also

History of Vietnam

References

1766 births
1820 deaths
People from Hà Tĩnh province
19th-century Vietnamese poets
Vietnamese male poets
19th-century male writers
Nguyễn dynasty writers
Tây Sơn dynasty writers
Epic poets